Bendre is an Indian surname native to the state of Maharashtra, Madhya Pradesh and Goa.
Typically it is found in the Marathi Chandraseniya Kayastha Prabhu (CKP), Chitpavan Brahmin and Deshastha Rigvedi Brahmin (DRB) communities.

Notable people with the surname include:
 D. R. Bendre, a poet of the  Navodaya period of Kannada language
 N. S. Bendre, an Indian artist and one of the founder members of Baroda Group
 Sonali Bendre, a Bollywood actress and model

References

Indian surnames